Engineer Filippo Fiorentini founded the Fiorentini & C. S.p.A. factory of excavators in 1919 in Rome, Italy. He imported and distributed construction equipment. During the time of Fascism, restrictions banned import and Ing. Fiorentini started his manufacturing plant in Via Tiburtina near Stazione Tiburtina (San Lorenzo, in Roma)  for the construction of excavators such as scrapers/draglines and cranes under the license of an American company named Bucyrus.

The first excavators (models FB35 and FB38) were entirely built on site from 1930 to 1940. Around the 1930s, Fiorentini also opened a factory in Fabriano.

Fiorentini machines assisted all major Italian public works from 1930s . New models were scheduled to be produced but were delayed by World War II. During the war, in 1943, 117 workers died in the factory attacked by bombs dropped by the American military (Grassi, 2012). Eng. Filippo Fiorentini and his wife died shortly after of broken heart. Their only son, Giuseppe, also an Engineer, had the courage to start a new business activity, and in 1951 he was so successful  that he was ranked at the top of Rome tax payers. The Ing.F.Fiorentini & C. S.P.A. relocated further along the Tiburtina road, to a bigger plant, more modern and very effective. After World War II, the company produced FB50, 60, 100 and the massive FB200 that could hold 1000 tons. In the 1960s, there were some design changes. The company also produced bulldozers and hydraulic excavators. 
By studying Russian, Ing. Giuseppe travelled to the Soviet  Union and sold two big contracts with their ministry Machino Import, of some 1000 cranes to be used in the enormous project of the Transiberian Pipeline.

At that time the Company had won a technical and commercial battle against other companies from Germany much bigger ones than the Ing. F.Fiorentini & C. of Rome. As the sales were strong, both inside Italy for the reconstruction, and in Russia, the Company hired as many as 1000 employees, who were working in three plants (Rome, Fabriano, in Italy) and Toronto, Ontario, Canada.

In 1956 Count Giuseppe Fiorentini bought a second castle after the San Gallo castle in Nettuno, from prince Barberini, the farm estate and castle of San fabiano. A hunting resort, San Fabiano was useful for its public relations, where he invited many of his clients, such as the Russian Ambassador Rijov, and Mac Cormick of International Harvester. In fact the Company was designing and manufacturing cranes, excavators and crushing plants and represented for Italy the industrial line of H.I.

But in the sixties, things started to decline economically.
After a major setback in his industry in Rome, he took advantage of a national reform, that abruptly stopped the centennial rules of MEZZADRIA, where the Landlord was the owner of everything and the contadini the farmers were living in the farmhouses with the cows, and they were not  paying a rent, but the output of their work would be split 50/50 with the Landlord.

In 1975, engineer Giuseppe Fiorentini, the son of the company's founder, filed for bankruptcy and the company was obtained at no cost by another Italian company named Gepi. Gepi then changed its name to Nuova Fiorentini, meaning "New Fiorentini".

References
Grassi, L. (2012). Bunker di Roma, Guida ai Rifugi Anti-aerei. Sotterranei di Roma, Roma, IT.

Engineering companies of Italy
Manufacturing companies based in Rome